Seed money, sometimes known as seed funding or seed capital, is a form of securities offering in which an investor invests capital in a startup company in exchange for an equity stake or convertible note stake in the company. The term seed suggests that this is a very early investment, meant to support the business until it can generate cash of its own (see cash flow), or until it is ready for further investments. Seed money options include friends and family funding, seed venture capital funds, angel funding, and crowdfunding.

Usage

Traditionally, companies that have yet to meet listing requirements or qualify for bank loans, recognize VC as providers of financial support and value added services.  Seed money can be used to pay for preliminary operations such as market research and product development. Investors can be the founders themselves, using savings and loans. They can be family members and friends of the founders. Investors can also be outside angel investors, venture capitalists, accredited investors, equity crowdfunding investors, revenue-based financing lenders, or government programs.

Early-stage funding
Seed capital can be distinguished from venture capital in that venture capital investments tend to come from institutional investors, involve significantly more money, are arm's length transactions, and involve much greater complexity in the contracts and corporate structure accompanying the investment. Seed funding is generally one of the first steps investors offer to get startups on their feet before they become fully operational.  Seed funding involves a higher risk than normal venture capital funding since the investor does not see any existing projects to evaluate for funding. Hence, the investments made are usually lower (in the tens of thousands to the hundreds of thousands of dollars range) as against normal venture capital investment (in the hundreds of thousands to the millions of dollars range), for similar levels of stake in the company. Seed funding can be raised online using equity crowdfunding platforms such as SeedInvest, Seedrs and Angels Den. Investors make their decision whether to fund a project based on the perceived strength of the idea and the capabilities, skills and history of the founders.

Government funding
This is the most selective type of funding. Government funds may be targeted toward youth, with the age of the founder a determinant.  Often, these programmes can be targeted towards adolescent self-employment during the summer vacation.  Depending on the political system, municipal government may be in charge of small disbursements.  The European Commission runs microfinance programmes (loans under €25 000) for self-employed people and businesses with fewer than 10 employees.  European seed capital is available, but typically is limited to a 50% share.  European SMEs can often benefit from the Eureka programme, which federates SMEs and research organisations, such as universities. Government programmes are often tied to political initiatives.

Other sources
Seed money may also come from product crowdfunding or from financial bootstrapping, rather than an equity offering.  Bootstrapping in this context means making use of the cash flow of an existing enterprise, such as in the case of Chitika and Cidewalk.

Types of Seed funding

Friends and family funding: This type of seed funding involves raising money from friends and family members.

Angel investing: As mentioned above, angel investors are wealthy individuals who provide seed funding in exchange for equity ownership.

Seed accelerators: These are programs that provide startups with seed funding, mentorship, and resources to help them grow their businesses.

Crowdfunding: This type of funding allows startups to raise money from a large number of people, typically through an online platform.

Incubators: These are organizations that provide startups with seed funding, office space, and resources to help them grow their businesses.

Government grants: Some government agencies provide seed funding for startups working on specific projects or in specific industries.

Corporate ventures: Some big companies set up venture arms to provide seed funding to startups in their industry or complementary field.

Micro-Venture Capital: A type of venture capital that provides seed funding to new startups and early-stage companies with a small amount of money.

See also
 Angel investor
 Crowdsourcing
 Private equity
 Revenue-based financing
 Series A round
 Venture capital

References

Corporate finance
Venture capital
Angel investors